The list of bridges is a link page for any bridges that are notable enough to have an article, or that are likely to have an article in the future, sorted alphabetically by country.

Lists of bridges by country

Afghanistan

Albania

Algeria
Ouadi El Roukham Bridge

Andorra

Argentina
General Artigas Bridge
General Belgrano Bridge
Ingeniero Ballester Dam
Integration Bridge
Libertador General San Martín Bridge
Neuquén-Cipolletti bridges
Paso de los Libres – Uruguaiana International Bridge
Puente de la Mujer
Puente Transbordador
Puente Valentín Alsina
Rosario-Victoria Bridge
Salto Grande Bridge
San Roque González de Santa Cruz Bridge
Tancredo Neves Bridge
Zárate–Brazo Largo Bridge

Armenia

Aruba

Australia

Albert Bridge, Brisbane
Alexandra Bridge, Rockhampton
Alfords Point Bridge, Sydney
Algebuckina Bridge, near Oodnadatta, South Australia
Andrew Nixon Bridge, St George
Anzac Bridge, Sydney
Batman Bridge, Launceston
Birkenhead Bridge, Port Adelaide
Bolte Bridge, Melbourne
Bowen Bridge, Tasmania
Bridgewater Bridge, Tasmania
Burdekin Bridge, near Ayr and Home Hill
Captain Cook Bridge, Brisbane
Captain Cook Bridge, Sydney
Centenary Bridge, Brisbane
Desmond Trannore Bridge, Gordonvale
Eleanor Schonell Bridge, Brisbane
Fitzroy Bridge, Rockhampton
Gateway Bridge, Brisbane
Gladesville Bridge, Sydney
Go Between Bridge, Brisbane
Goodwill Bridge, Brisbane
Grafton Bridge, New South Wales
Hampden Bridge, Kangaroo Valley
Hobart Bridge, Hobart
Houghton Highway, Brisbane
Iron Cove Bridge, Sydney
Jack Pesch Bridge, Brisbane
Jervois Bridge, Port Adelaide
Jubilee Bridge, Innisfail
Kurilpa Bridge, Brisbane
Mary MacKillop Bridge, Port Adelaide
Mcgees Bridge, Hobart
Merivale Bridge, Brisbane
Mooney Mooney Bridge, Central Coast
Narrows Bridge, Perth
Neville Hewitt Bridge, Rockhampton
Nowra Bridge, Nowra
Quarter Mile Bridge, Victoria
Pyrmont Bridge, Sydney
Richmond Bridge, Tasmania
Ross Bridge, Tasmania
Roseville Bridge, Sydney
Sea Cliff Bridge, Coalcliff
Spit Bridge, Sydney
Story Bridge, Brisbane
Sydney Harbour Bridge, Sydney
Swanport Bridge, near Murray Bridge
Tasman Bridge, Hobart
Ted Smout Memorial Bridge, Brisbane
The Entrance Bridge, The Entrance
Tom 'Diver' Derrick Bridge, Port Adelaide
Tom Uglys Bridge, Sydney
Victoria Bridge, Brisbane
Walter Taylor Bridge, Brisbane
West Gate Bridge, Melbourne
William Jolly Bridge, Brisbane

Austria

Azerbaijan

Bahrain
King Fahd Causeway

Bangladesh

Jamuna Bridge
Rupsha Bridge
Karnafuli Bridge
Bhairab Bridge
Surma Bridge
Padma Bridge
Lalon Shah Bridge
Shah Amanat Bridge
Khan Jahan Ali Bridge
Payra Bridge
Hardinge Bridge

Belarus
 Kirov Bridge
 Sozh Floating Bridge

Belgium

Bermuda
Somerset Bridge, Bermuda

Bosnia and Herzegovina

Botswana
Kazungula Bridge (connects with Zambia)
Mohembo Bridge

Brazil
Fraternity Bridge (connects with Argentina)
Friendship Bridge (Paraguay-Brazil) (connects with Paraguay)
Hercilio Luz Bridge
Juscelino Kubitschek bridge
Paso de los Libres-Uruguaiana International Bridge (connects with Argentina)
Rio-Niterói Bridge
Journalist Roberto Marinho bridge (in São Paulo)
Bridge Builder João Alves (Aracaju)
Newton Navarro Bridge (Natal)

Brunei

Bulgaria

Cambodia

Monivong Bridge
Prek Tamak Bridge
Chroy Changva Bridge
Techo Morakot Bridge
Twin Dragon Bridge
Koh Kong Bridge
Kizuna Bridge
Stung Treng Bridge
Neak Loeung Bridge
Prek Kdam Bridge
Prek Pnov Bridge

Canada

Confederation Bridge
Hartland Covered Bridge
Quebec Bridge
SkyBridge

Cayman Islands

Chile
Calle-Calle Bridge
Cau-Cau Bridge
Juan Pablo II Bridge
Malleco Viaduct
Pedro de Valdivia Bridge
Río Cruces Bridge
Santa Elvira Bridge

China

Donghai Bridge—Second-longest over-sea bridge
Duge Bridge—Highest bridge in the world as of late 2016
Fengyu bridge
Lupu Bridge
Shanghai Yangtze River Bridge
Tongling Bridge
Wuhu Yangtze River Bridge

Colombia
César Gaviria Trujillo Viaduct
Envigado bridge
Puente de Boyacá
Puente de Occidente
Pumarejo bridge
Rumichaca Bridge

Costa Rica
Puente La Amistad de Taiwán
Puente del Rio Virilla

Croatia

Curaçao
 Juliana Bridge
 Emma Bridge
 Wilhelmina Bridge
 John Smith Bridge

Czech Republic

Denmark

Farø Bridges, between Falster and Zealand
Frederick IX Bridge spans the Guldborgsund strait between the islands of Falster and Lolland at Nykøbing Falster
Great Belt Bridge, between Halsskov on Zealand and Knudshoved on Funen, second longest section span of 1.6 km.
Guldborgsund Bridge spans the northern end of the Guldborgsund, between the islands of Lolland and Falster
Masnedsund Bridge crosses Masnedsund between the islands Masnedø and Zealand, part of route to Falster
New Little Belt Bridge, between Fredericia in Jutland and Middelfart on Funen
Old Little Belt Bridge, between Fredericia in Jutland and Middelfart on Funen
Øresund Bridge, Copenhagen, Denmark to Malmö, Sweden. Built 2000, connects Sweden with Denmark and Northern Europe with Europe
Queen Alexandrine Bridge crosses Ulv Sund between the islands of Zeeland and Møn
Sallingsund Bridge between the island Mors and the Salling peninsula on the mainland Jutland
Storstrøm Bridge between Falster and Zealand via Masnedø
Svendborgsund Bridge between the town of Svendborg on Fyn and Vindeby on the island of Tåsinge
Vejle Fjord Bridge between Mølholm and Nørremarken near the town of Vejle
Vilsund Bridge crosses Vildsund between Mors and Thy

Dominican Republic
Puente Juan Bosch, In Santo Domingo
Mauricio Báez Bridge, In San Pedro De Macoris

Egypt

6th October Bridge
Boulak Bridge
El Ferdan Railway Bridge
Suez Canal Bridge

Estonia

Faroe Islands

Finland

Georgia
 Ananuri Bridge
 Baratashvili Bridge
 Besleti Bridge
 Bridge of Peace
 Dandalo bridge
 Red Bridge (border)
 Varjanauli Bridge

Germany

 

Blue Wonder, or Loschwitz Bridge
Charlotten Bridge
Cologne Rodenkirchen Bridge
Elster Viaduct (Pirk)
Fehmarn Sound Bridge
Flehe Bridge
Göltzsch Viaduct
Gedser-Rostock Bridge
Hochmosel Bridge
Holzbrücke Bad Säckingen
Kaiser Wilhelm Bridge
Kennedy Bridge (Bonn)
Kocher Viaduct
Köhlbrand Bridge
Koersch Viaduct
Lindaunis Bridge
Ludendorff Bridge, the Bridge at Remagen, destroyed in the Second World War
Mangfall Bridge
Moselle Viaduct
Mülheim Bridge, Cologne
Neckar Viaduct, Weitingen
Nibelungen Bridge (Regensburg)
Oberbaum Bridge
Osten Transporter Bridge
Pfaffendorf Bridge
Pierre Pflimlin Bridge
Roman Bridge (Trier)
Schierstein Bridge
Strelasund Crossing
Tauber Bridge, Rothenburg ob der Tauber
Theodor Heuss Bridge (Düsseldorf)
Theodor Heuss Bridge (Frankenthal)
Theodor Heuss Bridge (Mainz-Wiesbaden)
Waldschlösschen Bridge
Weidendammer Bridge
Weihe Viaduct
Werra Viaduct, Hedemünden
Wommen Viaduct

Ghana
Adome Bridge

Greece

Guyana

Hong Kong

Hungary

Iceland
 Borgarfjarðarbrú
 Hvítá bridge

India

Ambhora bridge, Maharashtra
Atal Pedestrian Bridge
Atal Setu, Goa
Bandra–Worli Sea Link
Barddhaman Hanging Railway Bridge
Bhavnagar Cable Stayed Bridge
 Chicham Bridge, One of Asia's highest bridge
Coronation Bridge
Devisaur Arch Bridge 
Dobra Chanti Suspension Bridge, Uttarakhand One of the most stunning bridge in north india
Durgam Cheruvu Bridge
Ellis Bridge
Godavari Bridge, Rajahmundry
Golden Bridge
Howrah Bridge, the world's dirtiest cantilever bridge
Hatania-Doania Bridge
Janeshwar Mishra bridge, Balia
Janki Setu
Jubilee Bridge
Kacchi Dargah–Bidupur Bridge
Karimnagar Bridge, one of the longest cable stay bridge
Kalwa Bridge
Kolia Bhomora Setu
Mahatma Gandhi Setu
Majerhat Bridge
Manohar Setu
Mumbai Trans Harbour Link
Napier bridge
Nehru Setu or Sone Bridge
Nehru Bridge
New Yamuna Bridge, Allahabad 
Nivedita Setu
Pamban Bridge
Pipaldali Bridge
Phaphamau New Bridge, prayagraj (upcoming longest bridge in india).
Ponte Conde de Linhares
P. V. Narasimha Rao Expressway, Hyderabad
Raja Bhoj Setu
Ram Jhula, Nagpur
Saraighat Bridge
Siyom Bridge
Syansu Bridge
Vashi Bridge
Vallarpadam Bridge, Kochi
Vembanad Rail Bridge, Kochi
Vidyasagar Setu
Vivekananda Setu
Prakasam Barrage, Vijayawada
Kanpur over-bridge 
Kolia Bhomora Setu
Kota Chambal Bridge
Panipat Elevated Expressway
Adam's Bridge
Mothoor hanging bridge
Kampli Bridge, Karnataka.
Wahrew Bridge

Indonesia

 Barelang Bridge, Riau Islands
 Ampera Bridge, South Sumatra
 Suramadu Bridge, East Java
 Barito Bridge, South Kalimantan
 Kahayan Bridge, Central Kalimantan
 Kenjeran Bridge, Surabaya, East Java
 Kutai Kartanegara Bridge, East Kalimantan
 Tayan Bridge, West Kalimantan
 Youtefa Bridge, Papua
 Rantau Bridge, Riau
 Merah Putih Bridge, Maluku
 Pasupati Bridge, Bandung, West Java
 Siti Nurbaya Bridge, Padang, West Sumatera
  Kelok Sembilan Bridge, West Sumatera - Riau
 Soekarno Bridge, Manado, North Sulawesi
 Palu IV Bridge, Palu, Central Sulawesi

Iran

Khaju Bridge
Kohneh Bridge
Shahrestan bridge
Si-o-se Pol
Vahid Bridge
Veresk Bridge
Old Bridge of Dezful
Tabiat Bridge

Iraq
Al-Aaimmah bridge
Al-Sarafiya bridge

Ireland

Israel
Ad Halom
Allenby Bridge
Chords Bridge
Emek Ayalon Bridge
Zohar Bridge

Italy

Ponte dell'Accademia
Ponte Amerigo Vespucci
Castelvecchio Bridge
Ponte alle Grazie, Florence
Ponte delle Guglie
Ponte della Libertà
Ponte della Maddalena
Ponte Minich
Ponte Morandi
Rialto Bridge
Ponte Santa Trinita, Florence
Ponte degli Scalzi
Bridge of Sighs
Strait of Messina Bridge
Bassano bridge
Ponte Vecchio, Florence
Ponte Vecchio, Cesena
Ponte Punta Penna Pizzone, Taranto

Japan

Aioi Bridge, Hiroshima
Akashi Kaikyō Bridge, the longest suspension bridge in the world
Akinada Bridge
Bandai Bridge
Chikugo River Lift Bridge
Great Seto Bridge
Hakata–Ōshima Bridge
Hakuchō Bridge
Hirado Bridge
Hitsuishijima Bridge
Honshū–Shikoku Bridge Project
Hōrai Bridge the longest wood bridge in the world
Innoshima Bridge
Iwakurojima Bridge
Jotaro bridge
Kanmon Bridge
Kansai International Airport access bridge ("The Sky Gate Bridge R")
Kintai Bridge
Kita Bisan–Seto Bridge
Konohana Bridge
Kurushima-Kaikyō Bridge
Meiko Nishi Ohashi roadway bridges
Minami Bisan–Seto Bridge
Minato Bridge
Naruto Bridge
Nihonbashi
Ōnaruto Bridge
Rainbow Bridge
Shimotsui–Seto Bridge
Tatara Bridge
Tokyo Bay Aqua-Line
Tokyo Gate Bridge
Tsūjun Bridge
Tsurumi Tsubasa Bridge
Wakato Narrows Bridge
Yokohama Bay Bridge
Yoshima Bridge

Jordan

 Abdoun Bridge
 King Hussein Bridge

Kazakhstan
 Ramstore Bridge
 Semey Bridge

Korea, North

 Bridge of No Return
Sino–Korean Friendship Bridge (Sinŭiju)

Korea, South

 2nd Jindo Grand Bridge
 Bridge of No Return
 Banghwa of No Return
 Banpo of No Return
 Cheongdam Bridge
 Chiak Bridge
 Dangsan Railway Bridge
 Dongho Bridge
 Dongjak Bridge
 Gimpo Bridge
 Gwangan Bridge
 Gumbit(Geogeum) Grand Bridge
 Geomga Bridge
 Heangju Bridge
 Hannam Bridge
 Han River Bridge
 Han River Rail Way Bridge
 Hoengseong Grand Bridge
 Ilseon Grand Bridge
 Incheon Bridge
 Jindo Grand Bridge
 Nakdong River Bridge
 Namhae Bridge
 Noryang Bridge
 Masan Bay Bridge
 Magok Bridge
 Mapo Bridge
 Muyung Bridge
 New Heangju Bridge
 Olympic Bridge
 Samrangjin Bridge
 Seohae Bridge
 Seogang Bridge
 Seongsan Bridge
 Seongsu Bridge
 Seonimgyo Bridge
 Ulsan Grand Bridge
 Unnam Bridge
 Yanghwa Bridge
 Yangpyeong Bridge
 Yeongdo Bridge
 Yeongdong Bridge
 Yeongjong Bridge
 Yi Sun-sin Bridge
 Wonhyo Bridge

Kuwait
 Jahra Road Bridge

Laos

 Thai–Lao Friendship Bridge
 Second Thai–Lao Friendship Bridge
 Third Thai–Lao Friendship Bridge
 Fourth Thai–Lao Friendship Bridge
 Myanmar–Lao Friendship Bridge
 Pakse Bridge
 Chaiyaburi and Luang Prabang Bridge
 Oudomxay Bridge
 Muang Khong Bridge

Lebanon

Liberia

Libya
 Wadi el Kuf Bridge

Lithuania

Luxembourg
 Adolphe Bridge
 Grand Duchess Charlotte Bridge
 Passerelle
 Pulvermuhl Viaduct
 Victor Bodson Bridge

Macau

Malaysia

 Batang Baram Bridge
 Bukit Bunga-Ban Buketa Bridge
 Buloh Kasap Bridge
 Connaught Bridge
 Dabong Bridge
 Jambatan Iskandariah
 Jambatan Kota
 Jambatan Permatang Bendahari
 Jambatan Raja Pemaisuri Bainun
 Jambatan Sultan Abdul Jalil Shah
 Jambatan Sultan Abu Bakar
 Jambatan Sultan Ahmad Shah
 Jambatan Sultan Azlan Shah
 Jambatan Sultan Idris Shah II
 Jambatan Sultan Salahuddin Abdul Aziz Shah
 Jambatan Sultan Yusuf
 Kuala Krai Bridge
 Lake Temenggor Bridge
 Malaysia–Singapore Second Link
 Merdeka Bridge, Malaysia
 Monorail Suspension Bridge
 Muar Second Bridge
 Parit Sulong Bridge
 Penang Bridge
 Penang Second Bridge
 Permas Jaya Bridge
 Prai River Bridge
 Pulau Bunting Bridge
 Putra Bridge
 Selat Lumut Bridge
 Seri Bakti Bridge
 Seri Bestari Bridge
 Seri Gemilang Bridge
 Seri Perdana Bridge
 Seri Saujana Bridge
 Seri Setia Bridge
 Seri Wawasan Bridge
 Sultan Ahmad Shah II Bridge
 Sultan Ismail Bridge
 Sultan Ismail Petra Bridge
 Sultan Mahmud Bridge
 Sungai Johor Bridge
 Sungai Linggi Bridge
 Sultan Yahya Petra Bridge
 Victoria Bridge, Malaysia

Malta
Aldo Moro Street Bridge in Marsa, Malta
Manwel Dimech Bridge in San Ġiljan
Grand Harbour Breakwater Bridge in Valletta, Malta

Mexico

 Presumed Maya Bridge at Yaxchilan. If it was actually a bridge, it would be the longest one discovered in the ancient world.
Baluarte Bridge
Chiapas Bridge
El Puente del Papa
Mezcala Bridge
Ojuela Bridge
Puente de la Unidad
Roma – Ciudad Miguel Alemán International Bridge
Tampico Bridge
Texas Mexican Railway International Bridge

Moldova
 Eiffel Bridge, Ungheni
 Lipcani-Rădăuți Bridge
 Stânca-Costești Dam

Montenegro

Mozambique

Dona Ana Bridge
Unity Bridge

Myanmar

Anawrahta Bridge
Attaran Bridge
Ava Bridge
Dedaye Bridge
Hsinbyushin Bridge
Irrawaddy Bridge
Kattel Bridge
Kyungon Bridge
Maha Bandula Bridge
Pakokku Bridge
Sittaung Bridge (Moppalin)
Tarsan Bridge
Thanlwin Bridge (Mawlamyine)
Thanlyin Bridge
Thanlyin Bridge 2
Thegon Bridge
U Bein Bridge

Namibia
Katima Mulilo Bridge

Netherlands

Admiraliteitsbrug, Rotterdam
Blauwbrug, Amsterdam
Boezembrug, Rotterdam
Enneüs Heerma Bridge, Amsterdam
Erasmusbrug, Rotterdam
Hoge Brug, Maastricht
Hollandse Brug, Gooimeer and Ijmeer
John Frost Bridge, Arnhem
John S. Thompsonbrug, Grave
Ketelbrug, Ketelmeer
Magere Brug, Amsterdam
Moerdijk bridges, Dordrecht
Muntplein, Amsterdam
Python Bridge, Amsterdam
Sint Servaasbrug, Maastricht
Slauerhoffbrug, Leeuwarden
Van Brienenoordbrug, Rotterdam
Vlaardingse Vaart Bridge, Vlaardingen
Waalbrug, Nijmegen
Willemsbrug, Rotterdam
Zeeland Bridge, Schouwen-Duiveland and Noord-Beveland

New Zealand

Auckland Harbour Bridge
Bertrand Road suspension bridge
Bridge to Nowhere
Grafton Bridge
Kopu Bridge
Mangere Bridge
Mohaka Viaduct
Newmarket Viaduct
Otira Viaduct
Percy Burn Viaduct
Rakaia Bridges (road and rail)
Tauranga Harbour Bridge
Te Rata Bridge
Upper Harbour Bridge
Victoria Park Viaduct

Nigeria
Carter Bridge
Eko Bridge
Niger Bridge
Third Mainland Bridge

North Macedonia
Stone Bridge

Norway

Pakistan

Panama
 Bridge of the Americas
 Centennial Bridge
 Third Bridge over Panama Canal

Paraguay
Friendship Bridge
San Roque González de Santa Cruz Bridge

Peru
Inca Bridge
Puente de Piedra

Philippines

 Candaba Viaduct
 Buntun Bridge
 Mactan-Mandaue Bridge
 Magapit Suspension Bridge
 Marcelo Fernan Bridge
 Quezon Bridge
 San Juanico Bridge

Poland

Solidarity Bridge

Portugal

25 de Abril Bridge
Arrábida Bridge
D. Luís Bridge
Guadiana International Bridge
D. Maria Pia Bridge
Roman bridge (Chaves)
Ponte de Rubiães
Vasco da Gama Bridge, the longest bridge in Europe at 17.2 km

Puerto Rico

Cayey Bridge
General Mendez Vigo Bridge
Jesús Izcoa Moure Bridge (PR-5)
Puente de Trujillo Alto
Teodoro Moscoso Bridge (PR-17)
Puente Río Portugués
Puente de los Leones
Puente La Milagrosa

Qatar
Qatar–Bahrain Friendship Bridge

Réunion
Bras de la Plaine Bridge

Romania

Russia

Crimean Bridge
Krasnoyarsk Bridge
Khabarovsk Bridge
Khanty-Mansiysk Bridge
Ladozhsky Bridge
Millennium Bridge
Saratov Bridge
Surgut Bridge
President Bridge

Saudi Arabia
Jamarat Bridge
King Fahd Causeway

Serbia

Slovakia

Slovenia

Singapore

South Africa

Bloukrans Bridge
Grayston Pedestrian and Cycle Bridge
Hennie Steyn Bridge
Nelson Mandela Bridge
Paul Sauer Bridge
Van Stadens Bridge

Spain

Montabliz Viaduct
Alcántara Bridge
Pasarela del Voluntariado
Puente del Alamillo, Seville
Puente Euskalduna
Vizcaya Bridge, the oldest transporter bridge in the world
Rande Bridge
Bridge of Henares, Guadalajara

Sri Lanka

Suriname

Jules Wijdenbosch Bridge, Span of 1,504 metres (4,934 ft)
Coppename Bridge

Sweden

Älvsborg Bridge, 933 m (418 m span)
Höga Kusten Bridge, 1,867 m (1,210 m span)
Igelsta Bridge, 2,140 m
Lejonströmsbron, 207 m. The oldest wooden bridge in Sweden, from 1737.
Lidingöbron, 997 m. There was a  bridge there already 1802.
Öland bridge, 6,072 m
Öresund Bridge, from Sweden to Denmark. 7,845 m (of which 5,300 m in Sweden. 490 m span)
Tjörnbron Bridge, 664 m (366 m span)
Uddevalla Bridge, 1,712 m (414 m span)

Switzerland

Syria
Deir ez-Zor suspension bridge

Taiwan

Tajikistan
Tajik-Afghan Friendship Bridge

Tanzania

Thailand

Turkey

Aesepus Bridge
Akköprü, Ankara Province
Arapsu Bridge
Bosphorus Bridge (Boğaziçi Köprüsü), Istanbul, connects Asia and Europe.
Constantine's Bridge (Mysia)
Çanakkale 1915 Bridge (1915 Çanakkale Köprüsü), Çanakkale, also known as Dardanelles Bridge.
Demirköprü, Adana
Eurymedon Bridge (Aspendos)
Eurymedon Bridge (Selge)
Fatih Sultan Mehmet Bridge (F.S.M. Köprüsü), Istanbul
Galata Bridge (Galata Köprüsü), Istanbul
Karamagara Bridge
Kemer Bridge
Limyra Bridge
Macestos Bridge
Malabadi Bridge (Malabadi Köprüsü), Diyarbakır
Nysa Bridge
Kömürhan Bridge, Eastern Anatolia
Bridge at Oinoandai Antalya Province
Penkalas Bridge
Pergamon Bridge
Sangarius Bridge
Saraçhane Bridge, Edirne
Severan Bridge (Cendere Köprüsü), Adıyaman
Taşköprü, Adana
Valens Aqueduct
Varda Bridge (Varda Köprüsü), railway bridge in Adana Province
White Bridge (Mysia)

Turkmenistan
Atamurat-Kerkichi Bridge

Ukraine

United Kingdom

United States
 

Just a few of the most famous bridges in the U.S. are:
Brooklyn Bridge
George Washington Bridge
Golden Gate Bridge
Manhattan Bridge
San Francisco–Oakland Bay Bridge
Tacoma Narrows Bridge
Seven Mile Bridge

Uzbekistan
Afghanistan–Uzbekistan Friendship Bridge
Amu Daria River Bridge

Venezuela
Angostura Bridge
General Rafael Urdaneta Bridge
Orinoquia Bridge

Vietnam

Bãi Cháy Bridge in Hạ Long
Bính Bridge in Hai Phong
Cát Lái Bridge in Ho Chi Minh City and Đồng Nai Province
Cần Thơ Bridge in Cần Thơ and Vĩnh Long Province
Cao Lãnh Bridge in Đồng Tháp
Đò Quan Bridge in Nam Dinh City
Dragon Bridge in Da Nang
Đà Rằng Bridge in Tuy Hòa
Hàn River Bridge in Da Nang
Hiền Lương Bridge in Vĩnh Linh District, Quảng Trị Province
Mỹ Lợi Bridge in Long An Province and Tiền Giang Province
Mỹ Thuận Bridge in Vĩnh Long and Tiền Giang Province
Long Biên Bridge in Hanoi
Nguyễn Văn Trỗi Bridge in Da Nang
Nhật Tân Bridge in Hanoi
Phú Mỹ Bridge in Ho Chi Minh City
Rạch Miễu Bridge in Tiền Giang Province and Bến Tre Province
Saigon Bridge in Ho Chi Minh City
Sông Chanh Bridge in Quảng Ninh
Thanh Hóa Bridge in Thanh Hóa
Thanh Trì Bridge in Hanoi
Thị Nại Bridge in Qui Nhơn
Thủ Thiêm Bridge in Ho Chi Minh City
Thuận Phước Bridge in Da Nang
Trần Thị Lý Bridge in Da Nang
Tuyên Sơn Bridge in Da Nang
Vân Đồn Bridge in Quảng Ninh
Vĩnh Tuy Bridge in Hanoi
Yên Lệnh Bridge in Hà Nam Province and Hưng Yên Province

Zimbabwe and Zambia
Victoria Falls Bridge - linking Zimbabwe to Zambia, built in 1905 as part of the projected Cape-Cairo railway.

Lists of bridges by type
List of bridge types
Lists of covered bridges
List of road–rail bridges

Lists of bridges by measurement
List of highest bridges
List of longest bridges
List of tallest bridges

References